Gladys Yang (19 January 1919 – 18 November 1999) was a British translator of Chinese literature and the wife of another noted literary translator, Yang Xianyi.

Biography
She was born Gladys Margaret Tayler at the Peking Union Medical College Hospital, Beijing, China, where her father, John Bernard Tayler, was a Congregationalist missionary and a member of the London Missionary Society and where from childhood she became intrigued by Chinese culture.

She returned to England as a child and from 1927 to 1937 boarded at Walthamstow Hall in Sevenoaks, Kent. She then became Oxford University's first graduate in Chinese language in 1940, following studies there under Ernest Richard Hughes. It was at Oxford that she met Yang.

After their marriage, the couple were based in Beijing as prominent translators of Chinese literature into English in the latter half of the 20th century, working for the Foreign Languages Press. Their four-volume Selected Works of Lu Xun (1956–1957) made the major work of China's greatest 20th-century writer available in English for the first time. In 1957 their translation of the Qing dynasty novel The Scholars appeared.

The couple were imprisoned as "class enemies" from 1968 to 1972 during the Cultural Revolution.  Their work on The Dream of Red Mansions, an 18th-century novel still read by almost all educated Chinese, was interrupted by their imprisonment, but their faithful, readable three-volume translation appeared in 1978.

During the 1980s, Gladys Yang translated the works of other Chinese authors for the British publishing house, Virago Press, which specialized in women's writing and books on feminist topics.

Later in life, the couple spoke out against the 1989 Tiananmen Square massacre, and their unpublished memoirs were officially banned in China as a result.

Personal life
Gladys Yang died in Beijing in 1999, aged 80, after a decade of declining health. She was survived by her husband, two daughters and four grandchildren.

Their only son had committed suicide in London in 1979. When the couple were identified as class enemies and kept in separate prisons from 1968 for four years, their children were sent to remote factory farms to work. Their son became mentally ill there and never recovered.

Translations
 Guo Moruo, Chu Yuan: A Play in Five Acts, translated by Yang Hsien-yi and Gladys Yang, Beijing, Foreign Languages Press, 1953
 Hong Sheng, The Palace of Eternal Youth, translated from Chinese by Yang Hsien-yi and Gladys Yang, Beijing, Foreign Languages Press, 1955
 Lu Xun, Selected Works of Lu Hsun, Beijing, Foreign Languages Press, 1956-1960
 Wu Jingzi, The Scholars, translated by Yang Hsien-yi and Gladys Yang ; ill. by Cheng Shifa, Beijing, Foreign Languages Press, 1957
 Liang Bin, Keep the Red Flag Flying, China Youth Publishing House, 1957
 The Man Who Sold a Ghost : Chinese Tales of the 3rd-6th Centuries, translated by Yang Hsien-Yi and Gladys Yang, Beijing, Foreign Languages Press, 1958
 Selected Plays of Guan Hanqing, translated by Yang Hsien-yi end Gladys Yang, Shanghai, New Art and Literature Publishing House, 1958, republished: Beijing, Foreign Languages Press, 1958, 1979
 Feng Yuan-chun, A Short History of Classical Chinese Literature, translated by Yang Hsien-yi and Gladys Yang, Beijing, Foreign Languages Press, 1958 
 Sima Qian, Records of the Historian, translated by Yang Hsien-yi and Gladys Yang, Hong Kong, The Commercial Press, 1974; republished: Selections from Records of the Historian Written by Szuma Chien, Beijing, Foreign Languages Press, 1979
 Cao Xueqin, A Dream of Red Mansions, translated by Yang Hsien-yi and Gladys Yang], Beijing, Foreign Languages Press, 1978
 The Dragon King's Daughter: Ten Tang Dynasty Stories, Translated by Yang Xianyi and Gladys Yang, Beijing, Foreign Languages Press, 1980
 The Courtesan's Jewel Box: Chinese Stories of the Xth-XVIIth Centuries, translated by Yang Xianyi and Gladys Yang, Beijing, Foreign Languages Press, 1980
 Lu Xun, Call to Arms, Beijing, Foreign Languages Press, 1981
 Lu Xun, Wandering, Beijing, Foreign Languages Press, 1981
 Shen Congwen, The Border Town and Other Stories, edited by Gladys Yang, Chinese Literature Press, 1981
 Shen Congwen, Recollections of West Hunan, translated by Gladys Yang, Panda Books, 1982
 George Bernard Shaw, Pygmalion, translated by Yang Xianyi and Gladys Yang, Beijing, Chinese Literature, distributed by China Publications Centre, 1982
 Liu E, The Travels of Lao Can, translated by Yang Xianyi and Gladys Yang, Beijing, Chinese Literature, distributed by China Publications Centre, 1983
 Ding Ling, The Sun Shines Over the Sanggan River, translated by Yang Xianyi and Gladys Yang, Beijing, Chinese Literature, distributed by China Publications Centre, 1984
 Poetry and Prose of the Tang and Song, translated by Yang Xianyi and Gladys Yang, Beijing, Chinese Literature, distributed by China Publications Centre, 1984
 Zhang Jie, Leaden Wings, translated by Gladys Yang, London, Virago Press, 1987.
 Zhang Jie, As Long As Nothing Happens, Nothing Will, translated by Gladys Yang, Deborah J. Leonard and Zhang Andong, London, Virago Press, 1988.
 Shen Congwen, Selected Stories by Shen Congwen, edited by Yang Xianyi and Gladys Yang, Chinese Literature Press, 1999
 Feng Menglong, Selected Chinese Stories of the Song and Ming Dynasties, translated by Yang Xianyi and Gladys Yang, Beijing, 2000
 Qu Yuan, Selected Elegies of the State of Chu, translated by Yang Xianyi and Gladys Yang, Beijing, 2001

References

Further reading
 Yang Xianyi, White Tiger: An Autobiography of Yang Xianyi, Hong Kong: The Chinese University Press, 2002

1919 births
1999 deaths
Alumni of St Anne's College, Oxford
Writers from Beijing
Chinese–English translators
Republic of China translators
People's Republic of China translators
20th-century British translators
Literary translators
British women writers
20th-century women writers
People educated at Walthamstow Hall